Banestan-e Sadat Mahmudi (also Romanized as Banestān-e Sādāt Maḩmūdī; also known as Banestān and Bonestān) is a village in Sadat Mahmudi Rural District, Pataveh District, Dana County, Kohgiluyeh and Boyer-Ahmad Province, Iran. At the 2006 census, its population was 1,204, in 241 families.

References 

Populated places in Dana County